Marlette may refer to:

People
 Bob Marlette (born 1955), American record producer
 Doug Marlette (1949–2007), award-winning American cartoonist and writer

Places
 Marlette Lake Water System
 Marlette, Michigan, a city
 Marlette Township, Michigan

See also
 Marlet, surname
 Marlett, typeface